Sam James Laity (born 3 July 1976) is an English football manager who is currently the head coach of Houston Dash in the American National Women's Soccer League (NWSL). He was previously an assistant coach for fellow American team OL Reign, where he also served as interim coach for a period in 2021.

Managerial statistics

References

External links 
 

1976 births
Living people
Sportspeople from Plymouth, Devon
OL Reign coaches
English expatriate football managers
National Women's Soccer League coaches
OL Reign non-playing staff